Mirvish Productions, commonly known as Mirvish, is a Canadian theatrical production company, based in Toronto, Ontario, Canada. Founded in 1986 by David Mirvish with his father, Ed Mirvish, the company is the largest commercial theatre company in Canada. Mirvish Productions currently own and operate 4 theatres in the downtown Toronto area: the Royal Alexandra Theatre, Princess of Wales Theatre, Ed Mirvish Theatre, and the CAA Theatre.

History

Beginning and early years 

In 1963, at the encouragement of his wife (Anne) and son (David), Ed Mirvish purchased the Royal Alexandra Theatre in Toronto, saving it from demolition. He spent several months renovating the theatre and installing a large marquee at the front of the theatre. The theatre re-opened on September 9, 1963, with the Canadian premiere of  Never Too Late, which starred William Bendix. In the subsequent years, the Royal Alexandra Theatre was used as a "road house", which staged short touring productions from London and New York. 

In 1982, London's The Old Vic theatre was placed for sale and ultimately purchased by Ed Mirvish for £550,000, outbidding Andrew Lloyd Webber. With his son David, they refurbished the theatre to allow it to return to staging productions. The theatre reopened on October 31, 1983 with  The Queen Mother in attendance. Following mounting financial losses, Mirvish sold The Old Vic to a charitable trust in 1998, which will continue operating the theatre as a non-profit.

By 1985, Ed began to retire and transition out of the theatre industry. In 1986, David Mirvish sensed greater potential with the shows being staged by them, which led to the founding of Mirvish Productions in 1987.

In 1991, the Tomson Highway play, Dry Lips Oughta Move to Kapuskasing, was staged at the Royal Alexandra Theatre. It became the first play by an Indigenous author to be staged there, and was the first native Canadian play to receive a major commercial production in Canada.

Theatres 

The first theatre used by Mirvish Productions was the Royal Alexandra Theatre, which was purchased by Ed Mirvish in 1963. In 1987, the theatre was named a National Historic Monument. 

In 1991, Ed and David Mirvish began construction of a new theatre built on a vacant lot on King Street East in downtown Toronto. It was the first privately funded theatre to be built in Canada, since the Royal Alexandra Theatre in 1907. The new 2000-seat theatre was named the Princess of Wales Theatre in honour of Diana, Princess of Wales. The theatre opened on May 26, 1993, with a Canadian production of Miss Saigon that was produced in partnership with Cameron Mackintosh.

In 2001, Mirvish began leasing space at the Canon Theatre to present productions. As part of the lease agreement, Mirvish was granted the first right to purchase the theatre should it be placed for sale. This sale took place in 2008, when  Key Brand Entertainment agreed to sell the Canon Theatre to Mirvish. As part of the sale, Mirvish also acquired the 700-seat Panasonic Theatre. Although the sale of Canon Theatre was challenged by Aubrey Dan, Mirvish won the protracted legal battle, ultimately giving Mirvish two Yonge Street theatres.

On December 6, 2011, Mirvish announced that the Canon Theatre would be renamed the Ed Mirvish Theatre in honour of Ed Mirvish, who passed away in July 2007.

On September 29, 2012, Mirvish Productions announced a plan to demolish the Princess of Wales Theatre in favour of a multi-purpose complex designed by Frank Gehry that would include an extensive artwork collection available for public viewing, as well as museums, condominium units, and retail spaces. However, following extensive consultations and criticism from city planners, Mirvish announced a revised plan in May 2014 that would save the Princess of Wales Theatre.

On December 1, 2017, the Panasonic Theatre was renamed the CAA Theatre as part of a marketing partnership between Mirvish Productions and  CAA.

Theatre renovations 

In 2016, following the closure of the Canadian production of Kinky Boots, the Royal Alexandra Theatre underwent a $2.5 million renovation. 250 seats were removed in favour of larger, more comfortable seats and greater leg room, and a general refurbishment of the theatre was undertaken.

In 2019, the façade of the Royal Alexandra Theatre was wrapped in blue for the Canadian production of Dear Evan Hansen. The blue wrap was removed after the production closed.

In 2021, the Ed Mirvish Theatre underwent an extensive renovation in preparation for the Canadian production of Harry Potter and the Cursed Child, which opened on May 31 2022. The renovations, which cost $5 million, transformed the lobby areas and the auditorium and was done to truly immerse the audience in the play. This included a seat reduction, an aisle realignment, the addition of faux side and rear walls, and a new color palette and design work to match with the play's theme throughout the theatre.

Television

In 2008, Mirvish Productions partnered Andrew Lloyd Webber to produce a reality talent competition series,  How Do You Solve a Problem Like Maria?, based on the 2006 BBC One series of the same name. The series aimed to find a Canadian actress to play Maria von Trapp in the 2008 Andrew Lloyd Webber and David Mirvish revival of Rodgers and Hammerstein's The Sound of Music in Toronto. The series premiered June 15, 2008, on CBC Television, and ended July 28, 2008. Elicia MacKenzie was named the winner, and played the lead role in the Canadian production. The runner-up, Janna Polzin, was later named the alternate Maria for the same production.

In 2012, Mirvish Productions again partnered with Webber to produce another reality talent competition series, Over the Rainbow. This series, which premiered in September 2012 on CBC Television, was to find a Canadian actress to play the lead role of Dorothy in a North American production of Andrew Lloyd Webber's stage musical adaptation of The Wizard of Oz. On November 5, 2012, Danielle Wade was named the winner. She originated the role of Dorothy at the Ed Mirvish Theatre in December 2012, as well as the subsequent North American tour. 

Despite not winning the series, other contestants have gone on to perform lead roles in Canadian engagements of shows produced by Mirvish. The runner-up, Stephanie LaRochelle, made her Mirvish debut in the Canadian production of Dear Evan Hansen at the Royal Alexandra Theatre in 2019, when she was cast in the lead role of Zoe Murphy. The second runner-up, AJ Bridel, also made her Mirvish debut in the lead role of Lauren in the Canadian production of Kinky Boots in 2015 at the Royal Alexandra Theatre.

COVID-19 

On March 14, 2020, for the first time in the company's history, Mirvish Productions closed their doors and suspended all performances at their theatres due to public health concerns amidst the COVID-19 pandemic. The initial closures were planned to last for a month, with the performances of Hamilton and Come from Away being suspended. Due to province-wide shutdowns and restrictions implemented by the Ontario government, Mirvish's theatres remained closed indefinitely. This resulted in Hamiltons tour stop in Toronto ending abruptly, just one month into the planned three month run. 

Throughout the closures, Mirvish ran some virtual programming and entertainment. This included a YouTube web series Check in from Away, co-hosted by Come from Away cast member Steffi DiDomenicantonio and stage manager Lisa Humber. On August 24, 2021, Mirvish announced their 2021-22 subscription seasons to begin later that Fall. Mirvish's main subscription season resumed on November 30, 2021, with the 50th anniversary tour of Jesus Christ Superstar. However, on December 24, 2021, Mirvish cancelled the remaining two weeks of the show due to positive COVID tests within the cast and crew.

On December 15, 2021, the Canadian production of Come from Away returned to the Royal Alexandra Theatre for the first time since their forced closure in March 2020 because of the COVID-19 pandemic. However, a week after its re-opening, Mirvish was forced to pause performances of Come from Away because of positive COVID-19 tests. A week later, Mirvish announced that the Canadian production of Come from Away would close permanently, after 855 performances. This announcement was met with widespread shock from the Canadian theatre industry and many Canadian news outlets, with many expressing outrage at the lack of funding for commercial theatre companies. In an announcement on the closure, David Mirvish wrote:  “In other parts of the world, the government has stepped up to support the commercial theatre sector by offering a financial safety net for the sector to reopen and play during the pandemic, thus protecting the tens of thousands of good jobs the sector creates. That is the case in the US, the UK and Australia – where productions of Come From Away continue to play: in the US on Broadway and on tour, in London’s West End in the UK, and in Sydney, Australia. But in Canada there is no such government support. And without such a safety net it is impossible for the production to take yet another extended hiatus. The costs of reopening a second time are prohibitively high and risky. I know this news is shocking, and it causes me and our partners great pain to have to take this action, but we are simply out of options. The most responsible way forward is to close the production.”

On January 5, 2022, Mirvish announced a revised 2022 main subscription season. The planned West End transfer of Leopoldstadt was cancelled because of the continuing border closures in Canada and the large cast size, a few weeks before it was scheduled to open at the Princess of Wales Theatre. It was ultimately replaced with a transfer of Singin' in the Rain, that would be performed in September - October 2022. Pressure was similarly cancelled, and replaced by Jake Epstein's one-man show, Boy Falls From The Sky, which was added to main season subscription.

By August 2022, attendance at Mirvish shows showed signs of revitalization following several months of pandemic uncertainty and government-imposed capacity limits. On August 18, 2022, Mirvish said that the final three weeks of the pre-Broadway engagement of & Juliet were sold out and that they were unable to keep up with the demand for tickets to the show. Mirvish also noted that their new Canadian production of Harry Potter and the Cursed Child has been sold out since the start of their run. By the end of 2022, Mirvish had not cancelled a performance that year because of COVID-19, with The Globe and Mail noting the Canadian production of Harry Potter and the Cursed Child grossed approximately $2 million in sales over the last week of 2022 (setting a Canadian box office record for a non-musical play).

Description
 Schedule 
Although there are some exceptions, shows programmed by Mirvish at one of their theatres generally perform the traditional 8-performance week. There are often evening performances that begin at either 7:30pm or 8:00pm from Tuesday through Saturday. There are "matinée" (afternoon) performances at either 1:30pm or 2:00pm on Wednesday, Saturday, and Sunday. Mirvish's theatres do not perform shows on Mondays and are considered to be "dark" that day. This is a similar performance schedule to what is often seen on Broadway.

 Audience 
Attending a live theatre show is often a popular tourist activity in Toronto, with Mirvish's theatres as being the opportunity to see major theatrical productions. Tickets for Mirvish shows are purchased exclusively through the official Mirvish channels, such as by phone or through their website. By 2019, Mirvish introduced a digital lottery system where customers can enter for a chance to purchase tickets to many of their shows at a significantly discounted rate. This was first notably used for the 2019 tour stop of Book of Mormon, introduced again in 2020 for Hamilton, and has since been used for many of the popular productions offered by Mirvish.

In an effort to attract high school and post-secondary students, Mirvish began offering special student rates to the off-Mirvish subscription season packages in 2020.

 Programming and subscription seasons 

Mirvish Productions often programs a wide range of shows into their theatres each year. Historically,  musicals have tended to fare better with Mirvish's audiences than  plays and are often more frequently programmed. Also, the types of shows that are often performed at Mirvish's theatres typically include well-known, international productions that originated on Broadway and/or London's West End. On occasion, Mirvish programs shows that originated in other countries, such as Australia (Muriel's Wedding) and South Korea (The Last Empress). Mirvish frequently programs shows that are promoted as pre-Broadway engagements that run for a limited time before later opening on Broadway. Recent examples of this include Aladdin in 2011, Ain't too Proud in 2018, and & Juliet in 2022. World premiere performances of shows are occasionally run by Mirvish, such as Jane Eyre in 1996, and Arrabal in 2014.

Many of the shows programmed by Mirvish are run through their two subscription seasons. The main subscription seasons often consists of popular musicals and plays from Broadway that are  touring, pre-Broadway engagements, and transfers from London's  West End. Many of the shows offered on the main subscription season often run for 6 to 7 weeks, and are performed at any of their four theatres. As of 2018, there are approximately 45,000 main season subscribers.

In 2012, Mirvish began offering an off-Mirvish subscription season, which is similar to off-Broadway. These are smaller scale shows, and are often co-produced with smaller Toronto-area theatres with the intention of marketing them to larger audiences. Shows included in the off-Mirvish subscription usually include productions that are "edgier" and often include more mature content than what is normally seen in the mainstream productions in the main subscription season. Dramatic plays and  revues are commonly included in the off-Mirvish subscription seasons. The off-Mirvish subscription season has typically consisted of 3 productions, although 4 productions were included in the inaugural 2012-2013 season. Shows offered in the off-Mirvish subscription season typically run for 4 to 5 weeks, are normally performed at the CAA Theatre.

 Sit-down productions 

Mirvish often produces special Canadian engagements of shows on their stages, for either an extended engagement or open-ended runs (such as Come from Away) with no specified closing date. These local sit-down productions are similar to the local sit-down productions hosted in other major theatrical venues, such as Chicago or London, England. In many instances, though not necessarily all, these productions include casts that are entirely or mostly Canadian.

 Long running productions 
The following table lists the productions that have performed at least 100 performances continuously, or as part of special engagement or sit-down productions programmed by Mirvish. Productions that arrive as part of a tour, which normally run for 6 or 7 weeks, are not included in these totals. These figures assume the standard 8-week performance schedule used by Mirvish, which equals approximately 416 performances a year. All figures are approximate, unless otherwise cited.

Updated as of March 5, 2023

 Awards 
Many of the productions performed on Mirvish's stages are honoured by the annual Dora Mavor Moore Awards (commonly called the "Dora Awards"), which are given by the Toronto Alliance for the Performing Arts (TAPA) for the best in performing arts productions in the Toronto area. The Dora Award is the most prestigious award for Toronto's performing arts sector. Although similar in function to Broadway's Tony Awards or the  Olivier Awards in London's West End, the Dora Awards do not often affect the Toronto theatre scene. This has been attributed to the lack of promotion of the Dora Awards ceremonies, confusing award categories, and that many of the shows nominated have already closed by the time of the awards ceremony.

The most recent Dora Awards were held on September 19, 2022. Mirvish Productions led all nominees with 24 nominations, and 3 wins.

 Theatrical subscription seasons 

 Main season 

 Off-Mirvish season 

{| class="wikitable" style="font-size:96%;"
|-
!bgcolor="#DDDDFF" width="100px" | Season
!bgcolor="#DDDDFF" width="500px" colspan="7"| Subscription shows
|-
| 2012-2013 ||  Terminus ||  Without You  || Clybourne Park || Mary Walsh's Dancing with Rage
|-
| 2013-2014 || God of Carnage || Dead Metaphor || The Musical of Musicals (The Musical!) || 
|-
| 2014-2015 || Buyer & Cellar  ||  Boom  || Vanya and Sonia and Masha and Spike || 
|-
| 2015-2016 ||  Seminar  || Bigmouth  || Disgraced || 
|-
| 2016-2017 || Fight Night  || My Night with Reg || Butcher || 
|-
| 2017-2018 || Salt-Water Moon ||  King Charles III  ||  Fun Home || 
|-
| 2018-2019 ||  Oslo || Next to Normal  || A Doll's House, Part 2 || 
|-
| 2019-2020  || Us/Them ||  Room  ||  Indecent  || 
|-
| 2020-2021''' ||colspan="7" | The 2020-21 Mirvish subscription seasons were cancelled due to the COVID-19 pandemic. None of the shows originally scheduled for the season were performed.
|-
| 2021-2022 || Blindness ||  Room || Boy Falls From The Sky || 
|-
| 2022-2023 ||  Indecent  || Things I Know to Be True  || As You Like It, or The Land Acknowledgement  || 
|}

Theatres and current or upcoming productions

 An * after the opening date indicates that the listed show has not yet opened, but is scheduled to open on the given date at that theatre.
 Capacity is based on the capacity listed for the respective theatre on the Mirvish Productions website.

Notes
 Riverdance replaced The Boys in the Photograph on the 2008-2009 subscription season.
 Legally Blonde replaced Priscilla, Queen of the Desert on the 2009-2010 subscription season.
 The Last Ship replaced Girl from the North Country on the 2018-2019 subscription season.
 The Boy Friend replaced Hello, Dolly! on the 2019-2020 subscription season.
 Due to the COVID-19 pandemic that emerged during the 2019-2020 season, The Boy Friend, Room, and Indecent were cancelled.
 Boy Falls From The Sky replaced Pressure, and was added to the 2021-2022 main subscription season.
 Singin' in the Rain replaced Leopoldstadt on the 2021-2022 subscription season.

References

External links 
Official Website

1987 establishments in Ontario
Musical theatre companies
Theatre companies in Toronto
Mirvish family